The 2017 Monster Energy NASCAR All-Star Race (XXXIII) is a Monster Energy NASCAR Cup Series stock car exhibition race held on May 20, 2017 at Charlotte Motor Speedway in Concord, North Carolina. Contested over 70 laps, it was the second exhibition race of the 2017 Monster Energy NASCAR Cup Series season.

This is the first NASCAR All-Star race without Tony Stewart since 1998, Greg Biffle since 2003 and Carl Edwards since 2004.

Report

Background

The All-Star Race was open to race winners from last season through the 2017 Go Bowling 400 at Kansas Speedway and all previous All-Star race winners and Monster Race NASCAR Cup champions who had attempted to qualify for every race in 2017 were eligible to compete in the All-Star Race.

Entry list

Monster Energy Open

Monster Energy NASCAR All-Star Race

Practice

All-Star Race practice

Monster Energy Open practice

Qualifying (All-Star Race)

All-Star Race qualifying results

Qualifying (Open)

Qualifying results (Open)

Monster Energy Open

Monster Energy Open results

All-Star Race

All-Star Race results

Media

Television
Fox Sports was the television broadcaster of the race in the United States. Lap-by-lap announcer, Mike Joy, was accompanied on the broadcast by retired NASCAR drivers, Jeff Gordon and Darrell Waltrip. Jamie Little, Vince Welch, and Matt Yocum reported from pit lane.

Radio
Motor Racing Network (MRN) continued their longstanding relationship with the track to broadcast the race on radio. The lead announcers for the race's broadcast were Joe Moore, Jeff Striegle and Rusty Wallace. The network also implemented two announcers on each side of the track: Dave Moody in turns 1 and 2 and Kyle Rickey in turns 3 and 4. Alex Hayden, Winston Kelly, Kim Coon, and Steve Post were the network's pit lane reporters. The network's broadcast was also simulcasted on Sirius XM NASCAR Radio.

References

Monster Energy NASCAR All-Star Race
Monster Energy NASCAR All-Star Race
Monster Energy NASCAR All-Star Race
NASCAR races at Charlotte Motor Speedway
NASCAR All-Star Race